Robert Findlay is an Australian rules football umpire currently officiating in the Australian Football League.

He joined the Victorian Football League in 2001, umpiring in the 2008 Grand Final. He was appointed to the AFL list in 2009 and made his debut in Round 4 of that year, in a match between Richmond and Melbourne.

References

Living people
Australian Football League umpires
Year of birth missing (living people)